The Bird of Red and Gold is a solo jazz piano album by Barry Harris, recorded in 1979 and released in 1982.

Five of the twelve compositions were written by Harris. The original 12 tracks were reissued as a CD for a 1994 release, though the CD misprinted the recording as being from a session in 1989.

Reception

Allmusic awarded the album 4½ stars with its review by Scott Yanow calling it, "Superior bop-based music".

Track listing
"Nascimento" (Barry Harris) – 3:49
"Body and Soul" (Edward Heyma, Robert Sour, Frank Eyton, Johnny Green) – 5:40
"Sweet and Lovely" (Gus Arnheim, Charles N. Daniels, Harry Tobias) - 4:37
"Tommy's Ballad" (Harris) - 6:10
"Nobody's" (Harris) - 3:52
"Cats In My Belfry" (Harris) - 4:35
"This Is No Laughing Matter" (Buddy Kaye, Al Frisch) - 5:57
"Tea for Two" (Irving Caesar, Vincent Youmans) - 5:15
"My Ideal" (Newell Chase, Richard Whiting, Leo Robin) - 4:12
"Just One of Those Things" (Cole Porter) - 3:04
"Pannonica" (Thelonious Monk) - 6:37
"The Bird of Red and Gold" (Harris) - 2:27

Personnel 
Recorded on September 18, 1979.

 Barry Harris – piano, vocals

References 

1979 albums
Bird of Red and Gold, The
Barry Harris albums
Albums produced by Don Schlitten
Solo piano jazz albums